The Jolo Group of Volcanoes, more commonly referred to as the Jolo Group, are an active group of volcanoes in the island of Jolo in Southern Philippines. The Global Volcanism Program lists Jolo as one of the active volcanoes in the Philippines while the Philippine Institute of Volcanology and Seismology (PHIVOLCS) collectively list the group as Bud Dajo, one of the cinder cones on the island.

Location
The island is part of the Sulu Archipelago, in the province of Sulu, located within the Autonomous Region in Muslim Mindanao, one of the Regions of the Philippines.

Physical features
The volcanic island is dotted with cinder cones,  tuff cones, pyroclastic cones, maars and crater lakes.

The highest point in the island is Mount Tumatangas with an elevation of  asl. Bud Dajo has an elevation of  asl.

Guimba, Matanding, and Sungal, are some other volcanic cones near Bud Dajo.  Four crater lakes are located on the island: Lake Seit, Lake Panamao and Lake Timpuak and Sani Crater Lake.  Solfataric activity is found at Seit Lake.

Volcanic activity 
On January 4, 1641, a volcanic eruption covered much of Mindanao in darkness and sent showers of ash as far as Cebu and Panay. It was reported at the time as being from a small island "opposite the main river of Jolo" and the only possible source of eruption in Jolo is Mount Dakula near Lake Panamao.  From recent studies, the eruption was finally attributed to Mount Parker in South Cotabato.

A tsunami occurred in 1897, believed to have been caused by a local submarine eruption on September 21, 1897. It is possible this eruption was centered at Lake Seit, a volcanic maar with still active solfatara.

Volcanoes in the Jolo Group are young and considered active on the probable eruptions above.

Geology
Rock types are predominantly basalt and andesite.

Jolo Group is part of the Sulu Volcanic Arc, one of the two northeastern arms of the Sunda Plate which is in collision with the Philippine Mobile Belt. It is an area of frequent earthquakes and volcanic activity.

Like most volcanos in the former Sultanate of Sulu, the group is little studied scientifically.

All volcanos in the Philippines are part of the Pacific ring of fire.

Political
Because of aggravated political unrest, kidnappings of foreigners in 2009, and fighting between political independence and government forces, visitors are strongly recommended to keep away from the Jolo islands.

See also
List of active volcanoes in the Philippines
List of potentially active volcanoes in the Philippines
List of inactive volcanoes in the Philippines
Philippine Institute of Volcanology and Seismology
Volcano

References

External links
 Philippine Institute of Volcanology and Seismology (Phivolcs) homepage

Stratovolcanoes of the Philippines
Subduction volcanoes
Volcanic groups
Volcanoes of Mindanao
Mountains of the Philippines
Active volcanoes of the Philippines
Landforms of Sulu